Martina Ebm (born 24 February 1982 in Vienna) is an Austrian actress.

Life 
Martina Ebm was born in Vienna, moved to Mondsee in Upper Austria at the age of seven, where she attended the sports secondary school. After high school in Salzburg she returned to Vienna. From 2001 she first studied International Business Administration at the University of Vienna and from 2002 at the Medical University of Vienna. From 2004, she studied theater, film and media studies at the University of Vienna, graduating in 2010 with a thesis on "The Foundation of acting is the reality of doing: the Americanization of the acting theory Stanislawskis by Sanford Meisner". In December 2007, she completed the stage rehearsal exam, followed by a six-week course at the New York Film Academy.

From 2011 to 2013, she played the role of the young Alma in the drama Alma - A Show Biz directed by Paulus Manker - in Vienna and in Prague. In 2013 she starred in the film adaptation of Kurt Palm's novel Bad Fucking. Since autumn 2014 she is a member of the ensemble at the Theater in der Josefstadt, where she starred as Kati in Nestroy's , and in the world premiere of Christopher Hampton's A Dark Desire in the role of Sabina Spielrein.

Since 2015 she has appeared in the ORF television series Vorstadtweiber in one of the leading roles as Caroline "Caro" Melzer. The second season of the series was broadcast in 2016, the third season is to be shown in early 2018. In 2016 she was awarded the Mostdipf Prize of the Upper Austrian News. In 2017 she was shooting for the ORF / ARD comedy Law or Justice in front of the camera, in which she played a lawyer alongside Maria Happel.

Ebm is partners with the Viennese director Umut Dağ and mother of twins.

Filmography 
 2010: FC Rückpass – 
 2010: Spuren des Bösen (TV film)
 2011: Die Lottosieger – 
 2013: CopStories – 
 2013: Bad Fucking
 2013: Allein (short film)
 2014: Die Hebamme (TV film)
 2014: SOKO Kitzbühel –  
 2014:  (TV film)
 2014: Manie (short film)
 2015-present: Vorstadtweiber (TV series)
 2016: SOKO Wien – Out of control

References

External links

University of Vienna alumni
Austrian film actresses
1982 births
Austrian stage actresses
Living people